David Tannock  (1873–1952) was a notable New Zealand horticulturist, landscape architect, superintendent of reserves and silviculturist. He was born in Tarbolton, Ayrshire, Scotland, in 1873.

In the 1948 King's Birthday Honours, Tannock was appointed an Officer of the Order of the British Empire for services to horticulture.

References

1873 births
1952 deaths
Scottish emigrants to New Zealand
New Zealand horticulturists
New Zealand foresters
People from Tarbolton
New Zealand landscape architects
New Zealand Officers of the Order of the British Empire